The El Al Flight 253 attack was perpetrated on a Boeing 707 passenger plane en route from Tel Aviv, Israel, to New York City, United States.

Background
Days before the attack, the European and American authorities warned European airlines about bomb threats during the pre-Christmas holiday rush.

The incident came five months after a group of self-styled Palestinian Arab commandos hijacked another El Al airliner, shortly after takeoff from Rome for Tel Aviv on July 23 and forced it to fly to Algiers. Algeria eventually released all passengers and crewmen and the plane.

Attack
Two Palestine Liberation Organization members attacked the plane as it was about to depart from a layover in Athens, Greece on December 26, 1968.  One passenger, Israeli Leon Shirdan, 50, of Haifa, a marine engineer, was shot dead. He was survived by his wife and then 15-year-old daughter. Two unidentified women were injured, one by a bullet, the other as she leaped from the jet when the door was opened. The two terrorists were 19-year-old Naheb H. Suleiman, born in Tripoli, Libya, of Palestinian parents, and 25-year-old Mahmoud Mohammad Issa Mohammad, born in 1943 in Mandatory Palestine. They were members of the Lebanese-based militant organization Popular Front for the Liberation of Palestine. The two dashed out of the transit lounge of Athens Airport just as the Israeli plane, parked 200 yards away, was preparing to take off. The plane had flown in earlier from Tel Aviv. Mohammad fired at the plane for more than a minute with a submachine gun, killing one, while Suleiman threw two hand grenades, creating panic aboard the plane carrying 10 crew members and 41 passengers.

As a result of the attack, the plane was damaged. The two men had arrived on an earlier Olympic Airways flight from Cairo. 37 of the 41 passengers boarded the flight in Tel Aviv, and four boarded in Athens.

Aftermath

Perpetrators
The two men were taken into custody by Greek authorities. Both confessed they were members of a Palestinian organization and had planned to destroy the jet and kill all Israeli passengers aboard. Mohammad was sentenced to 17 years and 5 months in prison, but was freed after less than 4 months after another Palestinian terrorist group hijacked a Greek airliner and demanded his release. Subsequently, he successfully hid his terrorist past and emigrated to Canada. Once Canadian authorities learned of his crime, a protracted extradition process culminated in his extradition to Lebanon in 2013.

Retributory raid
Two days after the attack, Israel raided the Beirut International Airport, destroying  12 (or possibly 13) Lebanese passenger airplanes. The attack drew a sharp rebuke from the US, who stated that nothing suggested that the Lebanese authorities had anything to do with the  El Al attack.

References

El Al accidents and incidents
1968 murders in Greece
Palestinian terrorist incidents in Europe
Attacks on aircraft by Palestinian militant groups
Palestinian terrorist incidents in Greece
20th century in Athens
Crime in Athens
Popular Front for the Liberation of Palestine attacks
December 1968 events in Europe
Terrorist incidents in Europe in 1968
Terrorist incidents in Greece in the 1960s
International terrorism
Accidents and incidents involving the Boeing 707